Hertburn is a studio album by musician Kevin Coyne, his ninth, released in 1976 on the Virgin label.

Background 
The album cover, designed by Hipgnosis, depicts someone jumping off a building.  A poster for release was also produced, by Cooke Key Associates, from photographs by Brian Cooke/Redferns.

The track "Don't Make Waves" (b/w "Mona Where's My Trousers") was issued as a single in 1976 and the songs "Shangri-la"  and "Daddy" we both used as B-sides for singles the same year.

Reception

Track listing
All songs written by Kevin Coyne except where noted.

Side 1
 "Strange Locomotion" (Coyne, Cudworth) – 3:28
 "Don't Make Waves" – 2:50
 "Happy Band" – 2:36
 "I Love My Mother" (arr. Graham Preskett; Summers, Coyne) – 4:40
 "Shangri-La" – 5:26

Side 2
"America" – 4:07
 "Big White Bird" – 2:05
 "Games Games Games" – 5:32
 "My Mother's Eyes" (Baer, lyrics by Gilbert) – 3:27
 "Daddy" – 4:12

Personnel

Musicians
 Kevin Coyne – acoustic guitar, vocals
 Andy Summers – guitar
 Zoot Money – keyboards, backing vocals
 Steve Thompson – bass
 Peter Woolf – drums, percussion

Technical
 Engineer: Phil Chapman
 Producer: Norman Smith
 Recorded at Olympic Studios
 Artwork, photography, design – Hipgnosis

References

External links

1976 albums
Kevin Coyne albums
Virgin Records albums